Shirin Bolagh (also Romanized as Shīrīn Bolāgh; also known as Shirin Bulag and Shirīnbulāq) is a village in Kaghazkonan-e Markazi Rural District, Kaghazkonan District, Meyaneh County, East Azerbaijan Province, Iran. At the 2006 census, its population was 133, in 33 families.

References 

Populated places in Meyaneh County